Britski's catfish (Corydoras britskii) is a tropical freshwater fish belonging to the subfamily Corydoradinae of the family Callichthyidae native to South America where it is found in the upper Paraguay River basin in Brazil. This species was formerly classified as Brochis britskii.

The fish has a high number of dorsal fin rays (15–18) when compared with other Corydoras species. It has a shorter snout than C. splendens, a larger eye, grows to a larger size, and has its head covered ventrally by a large shield extending beyond the tip of the mental barbels.

It feeds on worms, benthic crustaceans, insects, and plant matter. It lays eggs in dense vegetation and adults do not guard the eggs.

The fish is named  in honor of Heraldo A. Britski, the Curator of Fishes at the Museu de Zoologia da Universidade de São Paulo (Brazil), who brought the species to the describers attention and allowed them to scientifically describe it.

See also
List of freshwater aquarium fish species

References 

http://badmanstropicalfish.com/stats/stats_catfish_Brochis_britskii.html

Corydoras
Fish of South America
Fish of Brazil
Taxa named by Han Nijssen
Taxa named by Isaäc J. H. Isbrücker
Fish described in 1983